Javagone is a monotypic genus of southeast Asian sheet weavers containing the single species, Javagone maribaya. It was first described by A. V. Tanasevitch in 2020, and it has only been found in Indonesia.

See also
 Javanaria
 Javanyphia
 List of Linyphiidae species (I–P)

References

Monotypic Linyphiidae genera
Endemic fauna of Java